The Backlot Murders (also known as Death is Directing in Germany) is a 2002 American slasher film directed by David DeFalco. It stars Priscilla Barnes, Charles Fleischer  and Corey Haim. The film follows a killer in an Elvis mask murdering the cast and crew of a music video shoot.

Synopsis
When a rock band travels to a movie lot to shoot a music video, they aren't expecting much - especially since the main reason the band is getting the video is because its lead singer (Brian Gaskill) is dating the daughter (Jamie Anstead) of a big shot record producer (Tom Hallick). However, soon after they arrive, they find themselves sharing their stage with a serial killer in an Elvis mask.

Cast
Priscilla Barnes as Stephanie
Corey Haim as Tony
Charles Fleischer as Henry
Brian Gaskill as Dez
Carrie Stevens as Chelsea
Ken Sagoes as Mike
Angela Little as Shayla

Reception
Critical reception has been mixed. Bloody Disgusting panned the film overall, as they felt that the film was too cheesy for early 2000s fare and that it was overall "just too unimaginative". EFilmCritic.com reviewer Jack Sommersby was more positive, writing that it was "good, trashy fun, with the proper proportion of blood, nudity and humor."

References

External links

2002 horror films
2002 films
American slasher films
Films shot in California
Films directed by David DeFalco
2000s English-language films
2000s American films